İsmail Bilen (October 18, 1902 in Çinçiva village, Vija, Ottoman Empire – November 18, 1983 in East Berlin, GDR) was a Turkish politician. He was elected as General Secretary of the Central Committee of the Communist Party of Turkey in 1974.

Bibliography 
Ismail Bilen (political pseudonym - Bostandzhi Marat) (1902–1983).
A prominent leader of Turkish and World Communist movement.
General Secretary of the Turkish Communist Party from 1974 to 1983.

1922			        – Joined the Communist Party. 
1927 			        – Elected as a member of Central Committee. 
1927–1929 and 1933–1936	– Served as a member of the Political Bureau
			and Secretary of the Central Committee.
1937 and 1943		        – Representative of the CPT in the ECCI (COMINTERN).
6 June 1974		        – Elected as General Secretary of the Party's Central Committee.
April 1983		        – Chairman of the party.

References

 Bilen, İsmail: TKP MK Genel Sekreteri Kısa Biyografi, 

1902 births
1983 deaths
Communist Party of Turkey (historical) politicians
Expatriates in East Germany